Zhao Lirong (March 11, 1928 – July 17, 2000) was a Chinese singer and film actress.

Biography
Before she became involved in the film industry, Zhao Lirong was a famous Pingju supporting actress on the stage. From the 1980s, Zhao started her comedy performances in the CCTV Spring Festival Gala. In 1990, she received the award for Best Actress at the Tokyo International Film Festival and Hundred Flowers Awards for her first leading role in The Spring Festival. After this, Zhao continued her comedy career with CCTV. On July 17, 2000, Zhao Lirong died from cancer. As one of China's most beloved comedy actresses, thousands attended her funeral.

Filmography
 Third Sister Yang Goes to Court (1981)
 Monkey King (1986) (TV) Queen of Chechi States
 Dream of the Red Mansion Part 3 (1988) Granny Liu
 The Spring Festival (1991) Mother
 Erxiao's Mother/Filial Son and Filial Piety (1993) Mother

Awards and nominations

References

External links
Zhao Lirong -- an Artist Who Brings Laughter to China 

Five-year anniversary of Zhao Lirong's Death

1928 births
2000 deaths
Actresses from Tianjin
Chinese television actresses
Chinese film actresses
20th-century Chinese women singers
Ping opera actresses
20th-century Chinese actresses
Singers from Tianjin
Chinese women comedians
20th-century comedians